Love and Human Remains is a 1993 Canadian film directed by Denys Arcand and based on Brad Fraser's stage play Unidentified Human Remains and the True Nature of Love. Fraser also wrote the screenplay for the film adaptation. The film version follows the storyline of the original play fairly closely: a gay man and his heterosexual, female roommate try (who sexually experiments by having sex with a lesbian) to find love and sexual gratification in Edmonton, as a serial killer is loose in the city.

While the film was shot on location in Montreal, Quebec, the original stage play and the screenplay are both set in Edmonton, Alberta. There are attempts made in the dialogue, props and background film footage to identify the city as Edmonton, as in David's remark, "Let's order a Rosebowl pizza and discuss your sexual crises" (Rose Bowl Pizza is a well-known restaurant and bar in Edmonton). In another scene, the TV news reporter signs off from "CFR-" and gets cut off by the TV remote control before she can say "-N", the final call letter of Edmonton's CTV affiliate station. Sal's remark, "It's chicken night at Flash", is an allusion to Flashbacks, a long-gone Edmonton gay bar. There's also repeated use of a Sun newspaper (the Edmonton Sun is one of the city's major daily newspapers, although the city's name is not included in the masthead of the prop paper) and CBC-TV Canadian Football League footage of an Edmonton Eskimos game.

Fraser won a Genie Award for his adapted screenplay, while stars Mia Kirshner, Joanne Vannicola and Matthew Ferguson received acting nominations.

In 2011 it was finally released on Region 1 DVD from Sony Pictures Classic's MOD service. It is also available in the UK on a Region 0 ("region-free") PAL DVD issued by Arrow Films.

Cast

References

External links
 
 
 
 

1993 films
1993 comedy-drama films
1993 LGBT-related films
1990s English-language films
1990s serial killer films
Canadian comedy-drama films
Canadian LGBT-related films
Canadian serial killer films
English-language Canadian films
Gay-related films
Lesbian-related films
LGBT-related comedy-drama films
Films based on Canadian plays
Films set in Edmonton
Films shot in Montreal
Films directed by Denys Arcand
1990s Canadian films